Napaea  may refer to:
 Napaea (butterfly), a metalmark butterflies genus in the subfamily Mesosemiini and the family Riodinidae
 Napaea (plant), a flowering plant genus in the family Malvaceae

Species
 Boloria napaea, the mountain fritillary, a butterfly species
 Litoria napaea, the Snow Mountains treefrog, a frog species endemic to Indonesia
 Sicista napaea, the Altai birch mouse, a rodent species found in Kazakhstan and Russia

See also
 Napaeae, in Greek mythology

Genus disambiguation pages